Jean-Marie Buisset (21 August 1938, in Anderlecht – 7 February 2010) was a Belgium field hockey player and bobsledder. He competed at both the Summer and Winter Olympic Games.

As a field hockey player Buisset competed at the 1964, 1968 and 1972 Olympic Games. He also competed at the 1964 Winter Olympics as a bobsledder in both the 2 and 4 man events.

Buisset died after a short illness on 7 February 2010.

References

External links
 
 Jean-Marie Buisset's profile at Sports Reference.com

1938 births
2010 deaths
Belgian male field hockey players
Belgian male bobsledders
Olympic field hockey players of Belgium
Field hockey players at the 1964 Summer Olympics
Field hockey players at the 1968 Summer Olympics
Field hockey players at the 1972 Summer Olympics
Olympic bobsledders of Belgium
Bobsledders at the 1964 Winter Olympics
People from Anderlecht
Sportspeople from Brussels
Field hockey players from Brussels